Babylon Bank (ISX: BBAY) is a commercial bank in Iraq. It was established in 1998.
The bank has 12 branches in Baghdad, Mosul, Najaf, Karbala and Nasiriyah.

See also

Economy of Iraq
Central Bank of Iraq

References

External links
Official Website

Companies based in Baghdad
Banks of Iraq
Banks established in 1998
Iraqi companies established in 1998